David Brewster (1781–1868) was a Scottish scientist, inventor and writer.

David Brewster may also refer to:

David P. Brewster (1801–1876), U.S. Representative from New York
David Brewster (journalist) (born 1939), American journalist, founder of the Seattle Weekly and Crosscut.com
David Brewster (painter) (born 1960), American painter
David Brewster (politician) (1964–2021), former Ulster unionist politician
Dave East, (birth name David Brewster Jr., born 1988) American rapper